Pearl Street Market or the "Lower Market" was the oldest public market in Cincinnati, Ohio. It was established in 1816. The Market stood in the middle of Pearl Street between Broadway and Sycamore Streets. Famous visitors included President James Monroe and General Lafayette. The market was torn down in 1934. The site is now occupied by the Great American Ball Park.

Other historic Cincinnati markets were Fifth Street Market (razed for construction of Fountain Square), Sixth Street Market, Court Street Market, and Findlay Market, which is still in operation.

The bell from Pearl Street Market's tower now hangs in Findlay Market.

References

External links
 Pearl Street Market, circa 1900
 Pearl Street Market, circa 1905

Defunct companies based in Cincinnati
Food markets in the United States
1816 establishments in Ohio
1934 disestablishments in Ohio
Demolished buildings and structures in Ohio
Buildings and structures demolished in 1934